A clockspring (also referred to as spiral spring or spiral cable) is a type of spring often found in automobiles, that stores energy on a rotating axis. Clocksprings generally consist of a flat multicore cable wound in a spiral shape similar to a clock spring, hence the name, but the name is also given to devices fulfilling the same purpose but which use spring-loaded brushes contacting concentric slip rings.

In Automotive Systems 

In vehicle steering systems a clock spring or clockspring is a spiral-wound special rotary electrical connector which allows a vehicle's steering wheel to turn while still making an electrical connection between the steering wheel airbag and/or the vehicle's horn and other devices and the vehicle's electrical systems. The clockspring is located between the steering wheel and the steering column.

Notes

Auto parts
Electrical connectors